James Allen Dator is a professor and Director of the Hawaii Research Center for Futures Studies in the department of political science at the University of Hawaii at Manoa. He wrote on four futures archetypes which represent four alternative scenarios (Continuation, Limits & Discipline, Decline & Collapse, Transformation).

References

External links
Homepage at the University of Hawaii 
Why Futures Studies: An Interview with Jim Dator
TVOntario Dr. Jim Dator 1977, extro to an episode of the Doctor Who story "Planet of the Spiders"
TVOntario Jim Dator Farewell 1977 Dator's final Doctor Who extro.

Year of birth missing (living people)
University of Hawaiʻi at Mānoa faculty
Futurologists
Living people